The 2011–12 Puebla season was the 65th professional season of Mexico's top-flight football league. The season is split into two tournaments—the Torneo Apertura and the Torneo Clausura—each with identical formats and each contested by the same eighteen teams. Puebla began their season on July 23, 2011 against Atlas, Puebla play their homes games on Sundays at 12:00pm local time.

Torneo Apertura

Squad

Apertura 2011 Movements 
 Updated on August 29, 2011.

Regular season

Apertura 2011 results

Puebla did not qualify to the Final Phase

Goalscorers

Results

Results summary

Results by round

Transfers

In

Out

Torneo Clausura

Squad

Regular season

Clausura 2012 results

Puebla did not qualify to the Final Phase

Goalscorers

Results

Results summary

Results by round

References

2011–12 Primera División de México season
Mexican football clubs 2011–12 season
2011–12